Austin Ben Tincup (April 14, 1893 – July 5, 1980) was a pitcher in Major League Baseball from 1914 to 1928. In 1918 his career was interrupted while he served in World War I.

Life
Born in Adair, Indian Territory (now Oklahoma), Tincup was a member of both the original Cherokee Nation and its modern counterpart.

Career
Tincup was one of the first Native Americans to play Major League Baseball.

After his playing career, he was an umpire in the American Association (1933), a Minor League Baseball manager (1936–1939), a coach for the Brooklyn Dodgers (1940), a scout for the Boston Braves (1946–1948), Pittsburgh Pirates (1949–1953) and Philadelphia Phillies (1956–1958) and a coach for the New York Yankees (1960–1961).

References

External links

1893 births
1980 deaths
20th-century Native Americans
American military personnel of World War I
Baseball players from Oklahoma
Boston Braves scouts
Brooklyn Dodgers coaches
Cherokee Nation people (1794–1907)
Cherokee Nation sportspeople
Cherokee Nation United States military personnel
Chicago Cubs players
Fargo-Moorhead Twins players
Little Rock Travelers players
Louisville Colonels (minor league) players
Major League Baseball pitchers
Minneapolis Millers (baseball) players
Minor league baseball managers
Muskogee Indians players
Muskogee Reds players
Native American sportspeople
Native American United States military personnel
Paducah Indians players
People from Adair, Oklahoma
Peoria Reds players
Philadelphia Phillies players
Philadelphia Phillies scouts
Pittsburgh Pirates scouts
Providence Grays (minor league) players
Sherman Cubs players
Sherman Lions players